Disney Channel Original may refer to:

Disney Channel Original Movie
Disney Channel Original Series